Janeth dos Santos Arcain (born April 11, 1969 in São Paulo, Brazil) is a retired Brazilian professional women's basketball player. She played in the United States for the Houston Comets in the Women's National Basketball Association (WNBA) from 1997 to 2005.

Arcain is one of  the players inducted in the Women's Basketball Hall of Fame in 2015. She was inducted into the FIBA Hall of Fame in 2019.

WNBA career
Arcain was one of the original players selected from the WNBA's inaugural season in 1997. She was selected 13th overall in the second round of the Elite draft by the Houston Comets. She played every Comets game in the first seven seasons of the WNBA before skipping the 2004 season to prepare for the Olympics. A key piece of the Comets dynasty that included four championships from 1997 to 2000, Arcain had her best season in 2001, averaging 18.5 points per game en route to Most Improved Player and First Team All-WNBA honors.

National team career
With the Brazil national team, Arcain won the FIBA World Championship for Women in 1994 and two medals in the Olympic Games: silver in 1996, and bronze in 2000. Arcain also finished fourth in 2004, where she became the highest-scoring female player ever of the Olympics with 535 points, a record broken in  2012 by Lauren Jackson. She decided to retire after two big events to be hosted in Brazil, the 2006 FIBA World Championship for Women (fourth) and the 2007 Pan American Games (silver).

Arcain was named mayor of the 2016 Summer Olympics Olympic Village.

See also
 Afro-Brazilian

References

External links
WNBA Player Profile
WNBA interview "Nothing Beats An Original"

1969 births
Living people
Basketball players at the 1992 Summer Olympics
Basketball players at the 1996 Summer Olympics
Basketball players at the 2000 Summer Olympics
Basketball players at the 2004 Summer Olympics
Basketball players at the 2007 Pan American Games
Brazilian expatriate basketball people in the United States
Brazilian women's basketball players
FIBA Hall of Fame inductees
Houston Comets players
Medalists at the 1996 Summer Olympics
Medalists at the 2000 Summer Olympics
Olympic basketball players of Brazil
Olympic bronze medalists for Brazil
Olympic medalists in basketball
Olympic silver medalists for Brazil
Pan American Games gold medalists for Brazil
Pan American Games medalists in basketball
Pan American Games silver medalists for Brazil
Point guards
Shooting guards
Basketball players from São Paulo
Women's National Basketball Association All-Stars
Medalists at the 1987 Pan American Games
Medalists at the 1991 Pan American Games
Medalists at the 2007 Pan American Games